MP 1 or MP-1 may refer to any of the following:

MP 1, an abbreviation for a zone during the Paleocene
MP-1, an American auxiliary minelayer ship
MP-1, a car manufactured by Toyota
MP-1, a Russian Beriev biplane